Kemak is a language spoken in East Timor and in the border region of Indonesian West Timor. An alternate name is Ema. It is most closely related to Tocodede and Mambai. It has the status of one of the national languages in the East Timor constitution, besides the official languages of Portuguese and Tetum. The number of speakers has fallen in recent years.

References

External links 
 Kaipuleohone's collection of Robert Blust's materials include notes on Kemak

Timor–Babar languages
Languages of East Timor